Benjamin Duterde (born 10 November 1984), better known by his stage name Ben l'Oncle Soul, is a French soul singer and songwriter. He has released four studio albums, the self-titled debut Ben l'Oncle Soul in 2010, À coup de rêves in 2014, Under My Skin in 2016, and Addicted to You in 2020.

Career
After graduating in 2004, he started singing in a gospel group called Fitiavana. His friends called him "l'Oncle Ben" because he was often wearing a bow tie like Uncle Ben from Uncle Ben's Rice. But he decided to change the name in 2009, shortly before the release of his first EP, Soul Wash: Lesson 1, to avoid copyright problems. His eponymous debut album, Ben l'Oncle Soul, was released by Motown Records in 2010.

On 25 June 2011, Ben l'Oncle Soul opened the 32nd edition of the Montreal Jazz Festival in a major free concert in front of more than 10,000 people at the Scène TD de la place des Festivals in the heart of Montreal. The concert was his third appearance in Montreal having performed at the 2010 FrancoFolies and at the 2011 Montréal High Lights Festival. He performed at North Sea Jazz Festival on 9 July 2011, and appeared on Later... with Jools Holland on BBC 2 on 21 October 2011. As part of the London Jazz Festival, he played at the Queen Elizabeth Hall in the Southbank Centre, London, on 12 November 2011.

In 2014, Ben l'Oncle Soul released his second studio album, À coup de rêves. His third album, Under My Skin, was released in 2016, and Addicted to You in 2020.

Discography

Studio albums

Live albums

EPs
2009: Soul Wash: Lesson 1
2019: Ben
2023: Is it You?

Singles

*Did not appear in the official Belgian Ultratop 50 charts, but rather in the bubbling under Ultratip charts.

Features

Awards and nominations
2010: Nominated for the Prix Constantin for Ben l'Oncle Soul
2010: Nominated for La Chanson de l'année (The Song of the Year) for "Soulman"
2011: Nominated for Francophone Breakthrough of the Year for Ben l'Oncle Soul at the NRJ Music Awards
2011: Won for Best Male Singer of the Year at the Globes de Cristal
2011: Won for Live Breakthrough at the Victoires de la musique
2011: Nominated for Breakthrough of the Public at the Victoires de la musique
2011: Nominated for Album of the Year for Ben l'Oncle Soul at the Victoires de la musique
2011: Nominated for Music Video of the Year for "Soulman" at the Victoires de la musique
2011: Nominated for Best French Artist for Ben l'Oncle Soul at the MTV Europe Music Awards
2012: Won for European Border Breakers Award

References

External links
 Official website
 "Ben L'Oncle Soul". EBBA feature

1984 births
Living people
French people of Martiniquais descent
Musicians from Tours, France
21st-century French singers
21st-century French male singers